Carles Rexach i Cerdà (born 13 January 1947) is a Spanish former football winger and manager.

His career was mainly associated to Barcelona, spending 44 years at the club as a player (youth levels included) and coach. He formed a successful partnership with Johan Cruyff, both on and off the field, and as a player appeared in 638 games and scored 197 goals, winning the Pichichi Trophy in 1971; he won a combined eight titles both capacities combined, including the La Liga championship in the 1973–74 season and the 1979 Cup Winners' Cup.

Rexach appeared for Spain at the 1978 World Cup, earning 15 caps in nine years.

Playing career
Born in Pedralbes, Barcelona, Catalonia, Rexach made his senior debut for FC Barcelona on 25 April 1965 after having joined their youth system as a 12-year-old, scoring once in a 4–0 away win against Racing de Santander for the Copa del Generalísimo. His first appearance in La Liga took place on 10 September 1967, and he also found the net, but in a 2–3 away loss to Real Zaragoza; additionally, he spent two years on loan to CD Condal, who acted as the farm team.

In the 1970–71 season, Rexach scored a career-best 17 goals to win the Pichichi Trophy alongside Atlético Madrid player José Eulogio Gárate. His team finished in second position with the same points as champions Valencia CF, adding the domestic cup.

On 5 November 1974, Rexach netted a hat-trick to help the hosts defeat Feyenoord 3–0 in the second round of the European Cup, after three assists from longtime teammate Johan Cruyff. In the final of the 1978 Spanish Cup, he was chosen Man of the match after scoring twice in a 3–1 triumph over UD Las Palmas; on 16 May of the following year, he contributed with one goal in the 4–3 extra time defeat of Fortuna Düsseldorf in the decisive match of the UEFA Cup Winners' Cup.

Rexach retired in 1981 at the age of 34, and on 1 September, Barcelona played a testimonial match against Argentina at the Camp Nou. He made his debut for the Spain national side on 23 April 1969, playing the second half of the 0–0 friendly draw to Mexico in Seville; selected to the 1978 FIFA World Cup squad, he featured once in an eventual group stage exit.

Coaching career
After retiring, Rexach joined the coaching staff at FC Barcelona B. In 1984, he co-founded the TARR football school in his native city with fellow ex-players Juan Manuel Asensi, Joaquim Rifé and Antoni Torres.

Rexach joined Luis Aragonés's staff for the 1987–88 season, and briefly became caretaker manager when the latter departed after suffering a bout of depression. When Cruyff was subsequently appointed, he remained an assistant.

When chain smoker Cruyff needed emergency heart surgery during the 1990–91 campaign, Rexach once again stepped up, leading the club to its 11th league title – his first game in charge was on 27 February 1991, in a 6–0 home win against Las Palmas for the domestic cup. He remained in the position throughout the Dream Team era and, after president Josep Lluís Nuñez sacked the Dutchman in May 1996, once again became head coach, a decision which allegedly cost him the friendship of Cruyff; after new manager Bobby Robson replaced him with José Mourinho as his assistant he became a scout, going on to be responsible for discovering Lionel Messi.

In 1998, Rexach moved to the J.League club Yokohama Flügels.

After Lorenzo Serra Ferrer was sacked by Barcelona towards the end of 2000–01, Rexach was named his successor. In the last matchday, following a 3–2 home defeat of Valencia CF and courtesy of a Rivaldo 87th-minute wonder goal, they managed to qualify for the Champions League; this resulted in him being appointed coach by Joan Gaspart for the following season, but after being ousted by Real Madrid in the semi-finals of the Champions League, by UE Figueres in the Spanish Cup and having lost the final of the Copa Catalunya to CF Balaguer, he was fired and replaced by a returning Louis van Gaal, continuing to work with the club in directorial capacities.

On 8 April 2010, Rexach announced his intention to run for Barcelona's presidency, Nothing came of it eventually, but he was nonetheless chosen by new chairman Sandro Rosell as sporting advisor alongside Josep Maria Fusté and Migueli.

Career statistics

Managerial statistics

Honours

Player
Barcelona
La Liga: 1973–74
Copa del Rey: 1967–68, 1970–71, 1977–78, 1980–81
UEFA Cup Winners' Cup: 1978–79
Inter-Cities Fairs Cup: 1965–66, 1971

Individual
Pichichi Trophy: 1970–71

Manager
Barcelona
La Liga: 1990–91

References

External links
 
 
 FC Barcelona profile
 
 
 

1947 births
Living people
Footballers from Barcelona
Spanish footballers
Association football wingers
La Liga players
Segunda División players
CD Condal players
FC Barcelona players
Spain youth international footballers
Spain under-23 international footballers
Spain amateur international footballers
Spain international footballers
Catalonia international footballers
1978 FIFA World Cup players
Pichichi Trophy winners
Spanish football managers
La Liga managers
FC Barcelona managers
J1 League managers
Yokohama Flügels managers
Spanish expatriate football managers
Expatriate football managers in Japan
Spanish expatriate sportspeople in Japan
FC Barcelona non-playing staff